Githerere is an alleged settlement in Kenya's Central Province. It hasn't been confirmed.

References 

Populated places in Central Province (Kenya)